Release the Pressure is the debut album by rap group, Criminal Nation. It was released in 1990 for Nastymix Records and was produced by the group's producers, Eugenius and Womack. The album peaked at #73 on the Billboard charts' Top R&B/Hip-Hop Albums and also featured the hit single, Insane, which made it to #17 on the Hot Rap Singles. The video for another single Black Power Nation, gained some airplay.

Track listing
"Positively Funky"- 4:47
"Black Power Nation"- 3:42
"The Right Crowd"- 3:05
"Insane"- 3:57
"I'm Rollin'"- 5:22
"My Laboratory"- 4:24
"Violent Sound"- 2:48
"Release the Pressure"- 5:18
"Definitely Down for Trouble"- 4:49
"Criminal Hit"- 3:34
"Mission of Murder"- 4:35
"Take No Prisoners"- 3:28

1990 debut albums
Criminal Nation albums